
Gmina Złotów is a rural gmina (administrative district) in Złotów County, Greater Poland Voivodeship, in west-central Poland. Its seat is the town of Złotów, although the town is not part of the territory of the gmina.

Villages
Gmina Złotów contains the villages and settlements of Bielawa, Blękwit, Bługowiec, Bługowo, Buntowo, Dzierzążenko, Franciszkowo, Gajek, Górzna, Grodno, Józefowo, Kaczochy, Kamień, Kleszczyna, Kleszczynka, Klukowo, Kobylnik, Krzywa Wieś, Krzywa Wieś-Leśniczówka, Łopienko, Międzybłocie, Nowa Kleszczyna, Nowa Święta, Nowa Święta-Leśniczówka, Nowa Święta-Osada, Nowiny, Nowiny-Osada, Nowy Dwór, Pieczyn, Pieczynek, Płosków, Radawnica, Rosochy, Rudna, Skic, Sławianówko, Sławianowo, Stare Dzierząźno, Stawnica, Stawno, Święta, Wąsosz, Wielatowo and Zalesie.

Neighbouring gminas
Gmina Złotów is bordered by the town of Złotów and by the gminas of Jastrowie, Krajenka, Lipka, Łobżenica, Okonek, Tarnówka, Więcbork, Wysoka and Zakrzewo.

References
 Polish official population figures 2006

Zlotow
Złotów County